This is a list of colleges and universities in the U.S. state of Oregon.  Seven public universities, overseen by the Oregon Office of University Coordination, are operated by boards appointed by the governor, and seventeen community colleges are operated by locally elected boards. There are also numerous private degree-granting institutions.

The oldest college is Willamette University, which was established 1842, and is the oldest university in the Western United States. Central Oregon Community College (COCC) was founded in 1949 as part of the Bend School District and is the longest standing community college in Oregon. The COCC College District was formed in 1959 and officially established as the Central Oregon Area Education District by a vote of residents in 1962.

This list includes all schools that grant degrees at an associate level or higher, and are either accredited or in the process of accreditation by a recognized accrediting agency.

Institutions

Out-of-state institutions 
Several schools based in other states offer degree programs at locations in Oregon:
The for-profit schools Carrington College and the University of Phoenix have a campus in the Portland metro area.
Embry-Riddle Aeronautical University in Florida offers aviation programs at the Portland Community College campus and Portland International Airport.
Emporia State University in Kansas offers a Master of Library Science program on the Portland State University campus.
University of the Pacific in California offers a Master of Arts in Intercultural Relations at the Intercultural Communication Institute in Portland.
Walla Walla University's School of Nursing in Washington has a campus in Portland, where its junior and senior classes are taught.
Western University of Health Sciences in California operates an osteopathic medical school, the College of Osteopathic Medicine of the Pacific, Northwest, in Lebanon.

Defunct institutions

See also 

 Lists of Oregon-related topics
 Higher education in the United States
 Lists of American institutions of higher education
 List of college athletic programs in Oregon
 List of recognized higher education accreditation organizations
 Lists of universities and colleges
 Lists of universities and colleges by country

References

General

Specific

External links 
Department of Education listing of accredited institutions in Oregon

Oregon
Colleges